This is a list of places incorporated in the state of South Dakota as cities. Municipalities in South Dakota can also be incorporated as towns. South Dakota also has one incorporated village, Wentworth. There are 311 municipalities.

Cities

See also
 List of towns in South Dakota
 List of townships in South Dakota
 List of census-designated places in South Dakota

References

South Dakota, List of cities in
Cities